John Gall (September 18, 1925 – December 15, 2014) was an American author and retired pediatrician. Gall is known for his 1975 book General systemantics: an essay on how systems work, and especially how they fail..., a critique of systems theory. One of the statements from this book has become known as Gall's law.

Biography 
Gall started his studies in St. John's College in Annapolis, Maryland. He received further medical training at George Washington University Medical School in Washington, and Yale College. Eventually early 1960s he took his pediatric training at the Mayo Clinic in Rochester, Minnesota.

In the 1960s Gall started as a practicing pediatrician in Ann Arbor, Michigan and became part of the faculty of the University of Michigan. In 2001 he retired after more than forty years of private practice. In the first decades of his practice he had also "conducted weekly seminars in Parenting Strategies for parents, prospective parents, medical students, nursing students, and other health care practitioners." Until 2001 he held the position of Clinical Associate Professor of Pediatrics at the University of Michigan. Beginning in 1958 he was a Fellow of the American Academy of Pediatrics.

After he retired, Gall and his wife Carol A. Gall moved to Walker, Minnesota, where he continued writing and published seven more titles.
He died in December 2014.

Work 
Gall's main research interest was the behavioral and developmental problems of children, on which subject he published several scientific papers and some books. As a sideline he conducted more general research on the question, what makes systems work and fail. He collected and analyzed all kinds of examples of systems-failures, and generalized problems and pitfalls into a series of "Laws of Systems".

In 2002 Gall also published a historical novel on Hatshepsut, queen of ancient Egypt in the Eighteenth Dynasty. This interest arose from a trip John Gall had made to Egypt in 1969.

Systemantics 

In 1975 he published his systems research under the title General systemantics, republished two years later as Systemantics: How Systems Work and Especially How They Fail by Quadrangle, The New York Times Book Company. This work has been translated into Spanish, German, Hebrew, and Japanese.

In 1986 the second edition was published with the title Systemantics: The Underground Text of Systems Lore., which was almost twice the size of the first edition.

In 2002 he published a third edition under the title The Systems Bible. This work inspired many authors in the systems movement, such as scientists Mario Bunge (1979), Paul Watzlawick (1990) and Russell L. Ackoff (1999), and systems designers Ken Orr (1981) and Grady Booch (1991).

Gall's law 
Gall's Law is a rule of thumb for systems design from Gall's book Systemantics: How Systems Really Work and How They Fail. It states:

This law is essentially an argument in favour of underspecification: it can be used to explain the success of systems like the World Wide Web and Blogosphere, which grew from simple to complex systems incrementally, and the failure of systems like CORBA, which began with complex specifications. Gall's Law has strong affinities to the practice of agile software development.

Although dubbed Gall's Law by some, the phrase is not labeled as such in the original work. The work cites Murphy's Law and the Peter Principle, and is filled with similar sayings.

Although the quote may seem to validate the merits of simple systems, it is preceded by the qualifier "A simple system may or may not work." (p. 70). This philosophy can also be attributed to extreme programming, which encourages doing the simplest thing first and adding features later.

One of the first systems designers to quote Gall's law was Ken Orr in 1981. Notable were the quotations of Gall's Law by Grady Booch since 1991, which were mentioned in multiple sources.

Selected books 
 1975. General systemantics : an essay on how systems work, and especially how they fail, together with the very first annotated compendium of basic systems axioms : a handbook and ready reference for scientists, engineers, laboratory workers, administrators, public officials, systems analysts, etc., etc., etc., and the general public.. General Systemantics Press, Ann Arbor, Michigan.
 1986. Systemantics: The Underground Text of Systems Lore. How Systems Really Work and How They Fail (2nd edition). .
 1993. Elegant parenting: (how to do it right the first time. with Beth Gall.
 2002. The Systems Bible: The Beginner's Guide to Systems Large and Small (3rd edition of Systemantics). .
 2002. First Queen: A Historical Novel on the Life of Hatshepsut Queen of Egypt
 2004. Dancing With Elves: Parenting As a Performing Art
 2008. Hit by a Low Flying Goose. with Carol A. Gall

References

External links 

 General Systemantics™ Press
 Systemantics - extract

1925 births
2014 deaths
American information and reference writers
American social sciences writers
American pediatricians
St. John's College (Annapolis/Santa Fe) alumni
George Washington University School of Medicine & Health Sciences alumni
University of Michigan faculty
American systems scientists
Yale University alumni
People from Walker, Minnesota